An interstellar ark is a conceptual starship designed for interstellar travel. Interstellar arks may be the most economically feasible method of traveling such distances. The ark has also been proposed as a potential habitat to preserve civilization and knowledge in the event of a global catastrophe.

Such a ship would have to be large, requiring a large power plant. The Project Orion concept of propulsion by nuclear pulses has been proposed. The largest spacecraft design analyzed in Project Orion had a  diameter and weighed approximately 8 million tons. It could be large enough to host a city of 100,000 or more people.

Thrust concepts 
Another concern is selection of power sources and mechanisms which would remain viable for the long time spans involved in interstellar travel through the desert of space. The longest-lived space probes are the Voyager program probes, which use radioisotope thermoelectric generators having a useful lifespan of a mere 50 years.

One propulsion method for a crewed spacecraft could be a fusion microexplosion nuclear pulse propulsion system (like that proposed in Project Daedalus) that may allow it to obtain an interstellar cruising velocity of up to 10% of the speed of light. However, if the ship is capable of transits requiring hundreds of thousands of years, chemical and gravitational slingshot propulsion may be sufficient.

Specific proposals and research projects 
The Enzmann starship proposed in 1964 is a large fusion-powered spacecraft that could function as an interstellar ark, supporting a crew of 200 with extra space for expansion, on multi-year journeys at subluminal speeds to nearby star systems.

In 1955 Project Orion considered nuclear propulsion for spacecraft, suitable for deep space voyages.

In 1973–1978 Project Daedalus was conducted by the British Interplanetary Society to study uncrewed interstellar spacecraft.

See also
Generation ship

References

External links
News article
Lifeboat Foundation

Science fiction themes
Space colonization
Ark
Interstellar travel
Fictional spacecraft by type